The Château de Vaugrenier, also known as the Manoir de Vaugrenier, is a historic mansion in Villeneuve-Loubet, France. It was built in the 17th and 18th centuries. It has been listed as an official historical monument by the French Ministry of Culture since 1992.

References

Monuments historiques of Alpes-Maritimes